Matabeleland South Volleyball Association (MSVA) is the governing body of volleyball, beach volleyball and other forms of volleyball in Matabeleland South, province of Zimbabwe. It represents the interests of the provincial club volleyball.

The MSVA was founded in 2009. It was affiliated with ZVA in 2009 when the then Matabeleland Volleyball Association was split into three provincial volleyball associations, Bulawayo Volleyball Association, Matabeleland North Volleyball Association and Matabeleland South Volleyball Association. The main motto "ke motshameko wa rona" is in SeTswana/SeBirwa language meaning "it's our game". Variants of the motto are sometimes used with different languages found in the province, Sotho/Pedi "moraluko wa rona", Venda "ndi zwa hashu", Tsonga/Shangani "nthlangu wa hina", Khalanga "nzano yedu".

Executive

2009-2012

President: Mr. J. Mpofu 

 1st Vice-president: Mr. F. Ndlovu
 2nd Vice-president: Mr. A. Moyo
 Secretary General: Ms. S. Khumalo
 Treasurer General: Mr. M. Gumbo
 Committee Member: Ms. A. Mugabe

2013-2016

President: Mr. J. Mpofu 
 1st Vice-president: Mr. I. Masimba
 2nd Vice-president: Mr. B. Nyoni
 Secretary General: Ms. M. Mathema
 Treasurer General: Mr. M. Gumbo
 Committee Member: None
 Committee Member: None

2017-2020

President: Ms. M. Mathema 
 1st Vice-president: Mr. D. Horeka
 2nd Vice-president: Mr. P. Mdlongwa
 Secretary General: Ms. L. Mthombeni
 Treasurer General: Mr. M. Gumbo
 Committee Member: Mr. B. Nyoni
 Committee Member: Mr. A. Mudau

2021-2024

President: Mr. M. Gumbo 
 1st Vice-president: Mr. I. Masimba
 2nd Vice-president: Mr. L. Peula
 Secretary General: Mr. B. Nyoni
 Treasurer General: Dr. T. Mathe
 Committee Member: Ms. A. Mugabe
 Committee Member: Mr. M. Masuku

Activity
The MSVA has been active since its formation by organising club volleyball tournaments. Of note is the MSVA League that was created in November 2013 and resumed in 2014. In its sixth season running, the league has featured so far, teams as follows but not all in one season; Izihlobo, JM Nkomo Polytechnic, ZRP Gwanda, ZPCS Gwanda, Gwanda High and Gwanda Gvt all from Gwanda town, Jessie Mine and JZ Moyo High School from West Nicholson, Filabusi Wildones and GSU Cavaliers of Gwanda State University from Filabusi, Plumtree from Plumtree, Mzingwane Vipers of Mzingwane High School in Esigodini, Matopo Dolphins from Matopo High School, Beitbridge from Beitbridge and Colleen Bawn from Colleen Bawn.

Tournaments
 Season Opening "Yasuka yahlala"
 MSVA League
 Independence trophy
 Southern Region Invitational tournament
 End of season tournament

Inaugural MSVA League

The inaugural MSVA league (2014 season) was contested by five male teams with the final league standings as follows;

2015 season 

In 2015 the MSVA managed to organize a women's league. A provincial team was organized to participate in the Zimbabwe Volleyball Association Inter Provincial championships, the women team came out second after losing to Harare province in the final.

2016 season

The 2016 season kick-started in March 2016. There were initially nine men and two women teams participating. Due to lack of travel funds by teams, the league was reduced to four men's teams and no women league. The league was re-branded "The MSVA Super 4", composed of Izihlobo, ZRP Gwanda, Jessie Mine and Gwanda Government. However, the league was cancelled with only one match played, Izihlobo beating ZRP Gwanda, 3–1.

2022 season
The 2022 MSVA Volleyball League season kickstarted in October after a 2 year layoff due to COVID restrictions. It was participated by 12 men teams and 3 women teams. Beitbridge Eagles were the eventual men's champions, with Wolves and Jessie Mine taking 2nd and 3rd places, respectively. Gwanda High were the women champions, with GSU Cavaliers and Jessie Mine taking 2nd and 3rd places, respectively.

Volleyball in Zimbabwe
Sports governing bodies in Zimbabwe